Charlene Frances "Char" Morett-Curtiss (born December 5, 1957) is a field hockey coach and former player from the United States, who was a member of the Women's National Team that won the bronze medal at the 1984 Summer Olympics in Los Angeles, California.

Playing career
Morett attended Lansdowne-Aldan High School, before applying to Pennsylvania State University to study physical education. A member of the Nittany Lions field hockey team under coach Gillian Rattray, she became the all-time leading scorer with 50 goals – a record which remained for 21 years. She is the only player from the program to have been selected three times for the All-American first team. Morett was also a member of the United States women's national field hockey team for the 1980 and 1984 Summer Olympics. Unable to compete in 1980 due to the US boycott of the Moscow games, she won a bronze medal with the team four years later in Los Angeles.

Honors
She was inducted into the Pennsylvania Sports Hall of Fame in 2011. As consolation for the 1980 boycott, she was one of 461 athletes to receive a Congressional Gold Medal many years later. Morett has twice been inducted into the USA Field Hockey Hall of Fame, individually in 1989 and as part of the 1984 Olympic team in 2014.

Coaching career
After graduating in 1979, Morett became an assistant field hockey coach at Old Dominion University under coach Beth Anders. In 1984, she took up the position of head coach at Boston College. Morett returned to Pennsylvania State in 1987, succeeding her retiring former coach. She has since become the longest serving field hockey coach at the college, winning a total of nine conference titles – two in the Atlantic 10 Conference and seven in the Big Ten Conference.

See also
List of Pennsylvania State University Olympians

References

External links
 

1957 births
Living people
American female field hockey players
Penn State Nittany Lions field hockey players
Field hockey players at the 1984 Summer Olympics
Olympic bronze medalists for the United States in field hockey
Place of birth missing (living people)
Medalists at the 1984 Summer Olympics
Old Dominion Monarchs field hockey coaches
Boston College Eagles field hockey coaches
Penn State Nittany Lions field hockey coaches
Congressional Gold Medal recipients